The 1979 Primera División season was the 88th season of top-flight football in Argentina. River Plate won both the Metropolitano and Nacional championship, achieving 19 titles total.

There were three teams relegated,  Atlanta, Chacarita Juniors and Gimnasia y Esgrima (LP).

Metropolitano Championship

Group A

2nd place playoff
Vélez Sársfield 4-0 Argentinos Juniors

Group B

Semifinals

Final

Nacional Championship

Group A

Group B

Group C

Group D

Quarterfinals

Semifinals

Final

River Plate won on goal away rule

First leg

Second leg

References

Argentine Primera División seasons
Primera Division
Arg